is a junction passenger railway station in the city of Tatebayashi, Gunma, Japan, operated by the private railway operator Tōbu Railway.

Lines
It is also the terminal station for the Tōbu Koizumi Line and Tōbu Sano Line.

Platforms
The stations one island platform, one side platform and one bay platform connected by the station building located above.

Ryōmō trains on the Sano Line that start at Kuzū arrive at platform 5. At those times, the trains from Ōta waits at platform 2.

History

It was renamed Tatebayashi on 1 March 1937.

From 17 March 2012, station numbering was introduced on all Tōbu lines, with Tatebayashi Station becoming "TI-10".

Passenger statistics
In fiscal 2019, the station was used by an average of 11,046 passengers daily (boarding passengers only).

Surrounding area
 Syoda Soy Sauce Memorial Museum

See also
 List of railway stations in Japan

References

External links

 Tatebayashi Station information (Tobu) 

Tobu Isesaki Line
Tobu Sano Line
Tobu Koizumi Line
Stations of Tobu Railway
Railway stations in Gunma Prefecture
Railway stations in Japan opened in 1907
Tatebayashi, Gunma